Home For Christmas is the eighteenth (and most recent as of 2022) studio album by Hall & Oates, and their first full-length album of Christmas music. It was released in the US on October 3, 2006. A portion of the proceeds of the sale of this album goes to Toys for Tots. It was only available at Trans World Entertainment music stores in 2006, but has since become available at all retail outlets.

Previously, the duo released a promotional only single called "Jingle Bell Rock" in the early 1980s that had each of them separately singing the lead vocals on either side of the 45. The version of "Jingle Bell Rock" on this album is different from those two versions.

This album features two new songs written by Hall & Oates: "No Child Should Ever Cry on Christmas" and "Home for Christmas".

It includes a version of "It Came Upon A Midnight Clear", which became their second number one Adult Contemporary hit.

Track listing 
 "Overture/The First Noel" - 6:50 (Rob Mathes/Traditional)
 "It Came Upon a Midnight Clear" - 4:16 (Edmund Hamilton Sears, Richard Storrs Willis)
 "No Child Should Ever Cry on Christmas" (new song) - 4:03 (John Oates)
 "Everyday will be Like a Holiday" - 4:38 (William Bell, Booker T. Jones)
 "Home for Christmas" (new song) - 5:09 (Greg Bieck, Daryl Hall, Tom "T-Bone" Wolk)
 "Christmas Must be Tonight" - 4:26 (Robbie Robertson)
 "Children, Go Where I Send Thee" - 4:29 (Traditional)
 "Mary Had a Baby" - 5:03 (Traditional)
 "The Christmas Song" - 4:23 (Mel Tormé, Robert Wells)
 "Jingle Bell Rock" (new recording) - 2:09 (Joe Beal, Jim Boothe)
 "O Holy Night" - 5:27 (Traditional)
 "One On One (Live)" - 6:46 (Daryl Hall) [Japanese Version bonus track]

Personnel 
 Daryl Hall – lead vocals (1, 2, 4-8, 10, 11), backing vocals, keyboards, acoustic guitars, additional string arrangements (8, 11)
 John Oates – lead vocals (3, 9), backing vocals, acoustic guitars, electric guitars
 Greg Bieck – keyboards, programming
 Rob Mathes – keyboards, acoustic guitars, string arrangements and conductor
 David Sancious – acoustic piano, organ, additional backing vocals
 Michael Payne – additional acoustic guitars, additional electric guitars
 Tom "T-Bone" Wolk – acoustic guitars, electric guitars, bass
 Shawn Pelton – drums
 Matthew Payne – drums
 Charles DeChant – saxophone
 Klyde Jones – additional backing vocals
 The London Session Orchestra – strings
 Gavyn Wright – concertmaster, first violinist
 Isobel Griffiths – string contractor
 Vic Fraiser – librarian
 Lori Casteel – music preparation 
 Mike Casteel – music preparation

Production 
 Produced by Daryl Hall, T-Bone Wolk and Greg Bieck.
 Recorded and Mixed by Greg Bieck
 Engineered by Greg Bieck, Peter Moshay, Jamie Rosenberg and Peter Cobbin.
 Assistant Engineers – Katzutaka Noda, Taz Mattar and Louis Jones.
 Recorded at Studio Five Grand (Harbour Island, Bahamas), Sarm West Studios (London, UK), A-Pawling Studios (Pawling, NY), Abbey Road Studios (London, UK) and Great Divide Studios (Aspen, CO).
 Mastered by Bob Ludwig at Gateway Mastering (Portland, ME).
 Album Cover Art – Michael McCurdy
 Album Design and Packaging – Kathy Phillips
 Management – Wolfson Entertainment, LLC.

Charts

References 

Hall & Oates albums
2006 Christmas albums
Christmas albums by American artists
Pop rock Christmas albums